Silk Electric is the thirteenth studio album by American R&B singer Diana Ross, released on September 10, 1982 by RCA Records. It was Ross' second of six albums released by the label during the decade. It reached No. 27 on the US Billboard 200 (No. 5 R&B), No. 33 in the UK Albums Chart and the Top 20 in Sweden, Norway and the Netherlands. The album cover was designed by Andy Warhol.

The album contains Ross' US Top 10, Grammy-nominated single, "Muscles", which was written and produced by Michael Jackson. All other tracks were produced by Ross, including the US Top 40 follow-up single "So Close" featuring prominent background vocal arrangements by Luther Vandross.

The song "In Your Arms", written by Linda Creed and Michael Masser, was covered by Teddy Pendergrass and Whitney Houston as "Hold Me" the following year. The song "I Am Me" was co-written by Ross (and incorrectly listed as co-written by Cindy Birdsong instead of Janie Bradford on the Greatest Hits: The RCA Years compilation album). The album was certified Gold in the US and Silver in the UK.

Ross toured in support of the album in the US, Europe, Australia and Asia.

The album was remastered and re-released on September 2, 2014 by Funky Town Grooves as an "Expanded Edition", with bonus material.

Track listing

Personnel
Credits are adapted from the Silk Electric liner notes.

 Diana Ross – lead vocals, arrangements (3, 4, 5), backing vocals (3-10)
 Michael Jackson – uncredited backing vocals (1)
 Patti Austin – backing vocals (1)
 Julia Tillman Waters – backing vocals (1)
 Maxine Willard Waters – backing vocals (1)
 Luther Vandross – backing vocals (2), background vocal arrangements (2)
 Tawatha Agee – backing vocals (2)
 Cissy Houston – backing vocals (2)
 Paulette McWilliams – backing vocals (2) 
 Denzil Miller – keyboards (1)
 Michael Boddicker – synthesizers (1) 
 Greg Smith – synthesizers (1)
 Bill Wolfer – synthesizers (1) 
 Rob Mounsey – keyboards (2, 3, 7), arrangements (2, 3, 7)
 Steve Goldstein – synthesizers (2, 5, 10), arrangements (5)
 Ray Chew – keyboards (4, 5, 6, 8, 10), arrangements (4, 6, 10)
 Ed Walsh – synthesizers (6, 7)
 Paul Shaffer – Fender Rhodes (9), rhythm arrangements (9)
 Joe Bargar – acoustic piano (9)
 David Williams – guitar (1)
 Eric Gale – guitar (2, 5, 6, 8, 9)
 Jeff Mironov – guitar (2, 5, 6, 8, 9)
 Bob Kulick – lead and rhythm guitars (3, 4, 7, 10)
 Nathan Watts – bass (1)
 Neil Jason – bass (2-9)
 Lucio Hopper – bass (10)
 Jonathan Moffett – drums (1)
 Yogi Horton – drums (2-7, 9, 10)
 Rick Marotta – drums (8)
 Errol "Crusher" Bennett – percussion (10)
 Bill Reichenbach Jr. – string arrangements (1)
 Paul Riser – string arrangements (6, 8, 9), rhythm arrangements (8)
 Randy Brecker – horn arrangements (9)

Production
 Producers – Michael Jackson (Track 1); Diana Ross (Tracks 2-10).
 Engineers – Ross Pallone and Tom Perry (Track 1); Larry Alexander (Tracks 2-10).
 Assistant engineer on Tracks 2-10 – Dave Greenberg
 Track 1 recorded at Hollywood Sound Recorders (Hollywood, CA); Tracks 2-10 recorded at the Power Station (New York, NY).
 Mastered by Ted Jensen at Sterling Sound (New York, NY).
 Cover art – Andy Warhol

Charts

Certifications

References

External links
 

1982 albums
Diana Ross albums
Capitol Records albums
RCA Records albums
Albums produced by Michael Jackson
Funk albums by American artists
Albums with cover art by Andy Warhol